Nir (also Romanized as Nīr) is a city in the Central District of Nir County, Ardabil province, Iran, and serves as capital of the County. At the 2006 census, its population was 4,818 in 1,264 households. The following census in 2011 counted 5,820 people in 1,551 households. The latest census in 2016 showed a population of 5,873 people in 1,715 households.

References 

Nir County

Cities in Ardabil Province

Towns and villages in Nir County

Populated places in Ardabil Province

Populated places in Nir County